Aequorea vitrina, commonly called the crystal jellyfish, crystal jelly, lampshade or disk jellyfish, is a species of hydrozoan in the family Aequoreidae.

The specific name vitrina means "glassy", due to its transparent appearance; it should not be confused with Aequorea victoria, which is also sometimes called the crystal jelly.

Description 

Its stomach is about half the width of the disc. It has 60–100 radial canals, its gonads extend along almost their entire length.

Distribution 
Aequorea vitrina is found in the neritic zone in waters surrounding Great Britain and Ireland and in the North Sea. In 2017 it was recorded in the Sea of Marmara as an invasive species.

Behaviour
Feeds on brine shrimp (Artemia salina) and rotifers (Brachionus plicatilis). It is bioluminescent due to aequorin and green fluorescent protein.

References 

Invertebrates of the North Sea
Aequoreidae
Animals described in 1853
Taxa named by Philip Henry Gosse
Cnidarians of the Atlantic Ocean